Vitaliy Kolpakov (born 2 February 1972) is a Ukrainian athlete. He competed in the men's decathlon at the 1996 Summer Olympics.

References

1972 births
Living people
Athletes (track and field) at the 1996 Summer Olympics
Ukrainian decathletes
Olympic athletes of Ukraine
Sportspeople from Luhansk